"My Own Kind of Hat" is a song co-written and recorded by American country music artist Merle Haggard.  It was released in September 1979 as the second single from the album Serving 190 Proof.  The song reached number 4 on the Billboard Hot Country Singles & Tracks chart.  The song was written by Haggard and Red Lane.

Chart performance

Alan Jackson version

 Alan Jackson covered the song for his 1999 album Under the Influence. Although not released as a single, Jackson's cover charted at number 71 due to unsolicited airplay.

References

1979 singles
1979 songs
Merle Haggard songs
Alan Jackson songs
Songs written by Merle Haggard
Songs written by Red Lane
Song recordings produced by Jimmy Bowen
MCA Records singles